Lady Caroline Emily Nevill (31 May 1829 – 23 February 1887) was an early English photographer.

Personal life 
Caroline Emily Nevill was the eldest daughter of William Nevill, 4th Earl of Abergavenny, and his wife, Caroline Leeke. Her older brother William was born in 1826, at Longford Hall in Shropshire; her next-younger sister Henrietta Augusta was born in 1830, near Maidstone in Kent.

Photography 
Nevill and her younger sisters Henrietta (1830–1912) and Isabel (1831–1915) were together known as "The Trio" when they exhibited at the London Photographic Society in 1854. Nevill was introduced to photography by W.J. Thomas, editor of the journal Notes and Queries.

Lady Caroline was a pioneering member of the Photographic Exchange Club (founded 1855) contributing architectural views of Kent from 1855 to 1858. From 1859, she also contributed to the Amateur Photographic Association. She has her potrait made by Camille Silvy, which is now  at National Portrait Gallery.

Personal life 
Caroline Emily Nevill died in 1887, aged 57 years.

References 

1829 births
1887 deaths
19th-century English photographers
19th-century British women artists
English women photographers
Daughters of British earls
Pioneers of photography
Caroline Emily
Photographers from Shropshire
19th-century women photographers